German submarine U-393 was a Type VIIC U-boat of Nazi Germany's Kriegsmarine during World War II.

She did not carry out any patrols and did not sink or damage any ships.

She was scuttled on 5 May 1945 in Flensburger Förde.

Design
German Type VIIC submarines were preceded by the shorter Type VIIB submarines. U-393 had a displacement of  when at the surface and  while submerged. She had two shafts and two  propellers.

U-393 was fitted with five  torpedo tubes (four fitted at the bow and one at the stern), fourteen torpedoes, one  SK C/35 naval gun, (220 rounds), one  Flak M42 and two twin  C/30 anti-aircraft guns. The boat had a complement of between forty-four and sixty.

Service history
The submarine was laid down on 8 April 1942 at the Howaldtswerke (yard) at Flensburg as yard number 25, launched on 15 May 1943 and commissioned on 3 July under the command of Oberleutnant zur See Alfred Radermacher.

She served with the 5th U-boat Flotilla from 3 July 1943 and the 24th flotilla as a trials vessel from 1 November 1944. She then came under the 5th flotilla once more from 1 April 1945.

Fate
U-393 was bombed by US aircraft in Geltinger Bucht on 4 May 1945. Two men were killed; there were an unknown number of survivors. She was scuttled the following day in the Flensburger Förde near the Fyn Islands.

References

Bibliography

External links

German Type VIIC submarines
U-boats commissioned in 1943
1943 ships
Ships built in Kiel
World War II submarines of Germany
Operation Regenbogen (U-boat)
Maritime incidents in May 1945